Jenny Hunter Groat (born August 30, 1929 – February 2013) was an American dancer, choreographer, painter, calligrapher, book artist and educator.

She was born LaVida June Hunt in Modesto, California and moved to San Francisco to join the Anna Halprin-Welland Lathrop School and Dance Company. In 1956, Groat studied calligraphy at Reed College. In 1961, she set up her own dance company Dance West. Groat choreographed for KQED television, Stanford University, The Actors Workshop and the Carmel Bach Festival. After she retired from dancing in 1968, she studied Zen and took part in Jungian analysis. In 1972, Groat moved to Mill Valley and established a calligraphy practice. She also produced art books and painted abstract art.

Her art book A Vision is in the collection of the National Museum of Women in the Arts. Her book Beauty and the Beast is in the collection of the Humanities Resource Center at the University of Texas at Austin.

She married Maurice "Pete" Frederick Groat.

References 

1929 births
2013 deaths
American contemporary dancers
American women choreographers
American choreographers
Women book artists
Book artists
American calligraphers
American women painters
21st-century American women
Women calligraphers